Sing Street is a 2016 coming-of-age comedy-drama film written and directed by John Carney from a story by Carney and Simon Carmody. Starring Ferdia Walsh-Peelo, Lucy Boynton, Maria Doyle Kennedy, Aidan Gillen, Jack Reynor and Kelly Thornton, the story revolves around a boy starting a band to impress a girl in 1980s Ireland. It is an international co-production among producers from Ireland, the United Kingdom and the United States.

The film had its world premiere at the Sundance Film Festival on 24 January 2016. It was released in Ireland on 17 March 2016, in the United States on 15 April and in the United Kingdom on 20 May. The film received positive reviews from critics, grossed $13 million worldwide on a $4 million budget, and was nominated for Best Motion Picture – Musical or Comedy at the 74th Golden Globe Awards.

Plot

In inner-city south Dublin in 1985, Robert Lalor struggles with his architecture practice and his marriage, and drinks and smokes to excess. At a family meeting, he announces he is taking his youngest son Conor out of his expensive school and moving him to a Christian Brothers school, Synge Street CBS, which Robert asserts is of equally high repute. Conor's older brother Brendan ribs him about the change as well as about the state of the family unit.

Conor appears in his new uniform but without the regulation black shoes. The school principal, Br. Baxter, chastises him despite Conor's pleas of being unable to afford new shoes. To avoid going shoeless, he paints his shoes black. An encounter with the school bully, Barry, introduces Conor to Darren, an ally and budding entrepreneur. When Conor recruits aspiring model Raphina for a music video, Darren agrees to manage his band and introduces him to multi-instrumentalist Eamon.

The band practices in Eamon's living room, playing covers until Brendan encourages him to develop the band's own style. He writes original songs with Eamon, describing themselves as "futurists". The band films their first music video wearing comical costumes; Raphina acts as ingénue and makeup artist. Conor goes into school the next day wearing make up, and Brother Baxter forcibly removes it. Raphina gives Conor his nickname "Cosmo", which she says is more in keeping with his new band's image. After spending the day filming a music video for a new song, Conor and Raphina kiss. Conor also stands up to his bully, Barry by pointing out the insignificance of both their lives, which greatly upsets Barry.

Robert and Penny's marriage falls apart while Raphina and Conor's relationship blossoms. Conor takes Raphina out to Dalkey Island in his granddad's motor cruiser. Here, they view the car ferry leaving Dún Laoghaire for the UK and discuss Raphina's dream of leaving Ireland for London.

Conor, Raphina and the band prepare to film a Back to the Future-inspired music video for their new song, but Conor is disheartened when Raphina fails to show up. She reveals that she was set to leave for London with her boyfriend, but he abandoned her. Hurt by her lack of disclosure and offended by her nonchalance, Conor breaks up with Raphina. Because of the break-up and his family's problems, Conor finds difficulty in writing or playing music, but Brendan urges Conor to continue so he can make a better future for himself. Penny and Robert announce to the family that they are getting legally separated and selling the house. Penny plans on moving in with her affair and boss, Tony, whilst Robert plans on getting a small apartment. They will share custody. An opportunity arises for the band to play live at an end-of-year party at school. Conor strikes up a friendship with Barry, offering him the chance to be the band's roadie and escape his abusive family.

Conor prepares a new song mocking Baxter, which the band perform as an encore while distributing homemade masks of Baxter's face. Raphina arrives before the band finishes and reconciles with Conor. Both of them leave the party and the school in uproar. After secretly saying goodbye to his family later that night, Conor and Raphina persuade Brendan to drive them to Dalkey, so they can escape in the motor cruiser and head to London. Brendan agrees and drives them to the harbour, where Brendan and Conor embrace. Conor and Raphina sail out to sea, following the ferry across the rough Irish Sea to a new life in London. Brendan watches them disappear into the distance and cheers, overjoyed that his younger brother has left to go on to greater things.

Cast

Production

Development
In February 2014, it was announced that John Carney would be directing the film, from a screenplay he wrote about a boy starting a band in order to impress a girl. Carney would produce through his Distressed Films banner, along with Anthony Bregman through his Likely Story Banner, Kevin Frakes for PalmStar Media, and Raj Brinder Singh for Merced Media Partners, with Paul Trijbits and Christian Grass for FilmWave. The film is a semi-autobiographical depiction of Carney's upbringing in Dublin.

Casting

In a July 2014 interview, Carney announced he would be casting unknown actors in the film. The unknown actors turned out to be Ferdia Walsh-Peelo, Ben Carolan, Mark McKenna, Percy Chamburuka, Conor Hamilton, Karl Rice, and Ian Kenny. In September 2014, it was announced that Aidan Gillen, Maria Doyle Kennedy and Jack Reynor had joined the cast of the film, portraying the role of Conor's father, mother and brother respectively.

Filming
Principal photography on the film began in September 2014 in Dublin and concluded on 25 October 2014. Its namesake school, Synge Street CBS, was among the shooting locations for the film.

Music
Much of the original music by the band "Sing Street" was composed by Danny Wilson frontman Gary Clark, with Carney, Ken and Carl Papenfus of the band Relish, Graham Henderson and Zamo Riffman also receiving writing credits. Adam Levine co-wrote (with Carney and Glen Hansard) and sings on the track "Go Now".

The film also features music of the period from The Cure, a-ha, Duran Duran, The Clash, Hall & Oates, Spandau Ballet, The Blades and The Jam.

Soundtrack

The soundtrack album was released by Decca Records on 11 March 2016.

Release
In February 2014, it was announced that FilmNation Entertainment had been selected to sell international rights to the film. In May 2014, it was announced The Weinstein Company had acquired U.S distribution rights to the film, for $3 million.

The film had its world premiere at the Sundance Film Festival on 24 January 2016. The film screened at the Dublin Film Festival on 18 February 2016, and at South by Southwest on 11 March 2016. The film was released in Ireland on 17 March, and in the United Kingdom on 20 May 2016. It was released in the United States on 15 April 2016.

Home media
The film was released on DVD and Blu-ray on 8 August 2016.

Reception

Box office
Sing Street grossed $13.6 million.

In the United States, the film made $63,573 from five theatres in its opening weekend, an average of $13,796 per venue.

Critical response
Review aggregator Rotten Tomatoes reported an approval rating of 95% based on 214 reviews, with an average rating of 8/10. The website's critical consensus reads, "Sing Street is a feel-good musical with huge heart and irresistible optimism, and its charming cast and hummable tunes help to elevate its familiar plotting." On Metacritic, the film has a weighted average score of 79 out of 100 based on 38 critics, indicating "generally favorable reviews". Audiences polled by PostTrak gave the film a 96% overall positive score and an 85% "definite recommend".

Guy Lodge of Variety.com gave the film a positive review, writing "Perched on a tricky precipice between chippy kitchen-sink realism and lush wish-fulfilment fantasy, this mini-Commitments gets away with even its cutesiest indulgences thanks to a wholly lovable ensemble of young Irish talent and the tightest pop tunes—riffing on Duran Duran and the Cure with equal abandon and affection—any gaggle of Catholic schoolboys could hope to write themselves. Given the right marketing and word of mouth, this Weinstein Co. release could Sing a song of far more than sixpence."

In The Observer, Mark Kermode gave the film four out of five stars, writing: "When it comes to capturing the strange, romantic magic of making music, few modern film-makers are more on the money than John Carney." He added, "The bittersweet, 'happy sad' drama that follows has drawn inevitable, if misguided, comparisons with The Commitments, yet tonally this is closer to the teen spirit of Todd Graff's 2009 film Bandslam...or even Richard Linklater’s sublime School of Rock. As Carney has proved previously, he knows how to straddle the line between the sound in the room and the sound in your head – a sequence that segues from bedroom composition to living room rehearsal (with tea and biscuits) to full studio production perfectly negotiates the space between kitchen-sink realism and musical fantasy in which this lovely, lyrical movie casts its spell". Kermode concluded by saying, "Happy sad indeed. I laughed, I cried, I bought the soundtrack album."

Accolades

Stage adaptation

Sing Street, like Carney's film Once, was adapted for stage as a musical, also called Sing Street. The screenplay was adapted by Enda Walsh (who also wrote the book for the musical Once) and the production was directed by Rebecca Taichman. The show premiered at New York Theatre Workshop on 16 December 2019 after extensive workshops. The musical was set to premiere at the Lyceum Theatre in previews on 26 March 2020 and officially on 19 April. but it suspended its production due to the COVID-19 pandemic. Nevertheless, a cast recording featuring the original Broadway cast was released on 22 April 2020.

References

External links
 
 Official screenplay

2016 films
English-language Irish films
Irish coming-of-age comedy-drama films
2010s musical comedy-drama films
2010s coming-of-age comedy-drama films
British coming-of-age comedy-drama films
American coming-of-age comedy-drama films
Irish musical comedy-drama films
American musical comedy-drama films
British musical comedy-drama films
Films about education
Films about music and musicians
Films set in 1985
Films set in Dublin (city)
Synge Street school
Films directed by John Carney
2016 comedy films
2016 drama films
2010s English-language films
2010s American films
2010s British films